Eilema bipartita is a moth of the  subfamily Arctiinae. It is found in Tanzania and Uganda.

References

bipartita
Insects of Tanzania
Moths of Africa